Supply & Demand is the debut studio album by American Southern hip hop duo Playaz Circle from Atlanta. It was released on October 30, 2007 via Disturbing tha Peace and Def Jam South Recordings. Recording sessions took place at Upstairs Studio, The Bank, Hot Beats Recording Studios, The Ludaplex, PatchWerk Recording Studios and Doppler Studios in Atlanta, at Area 51 in Detroit, at Legacy Recording Studios in New York, at Hit Factory Criteria, Circle House Studios and H&N Studio in Miami. Production was handled by B-Crucial, Bigg D, Buckwild, Drumma Boy, Jean "J Rock" Borges, Knoxville, M16, Midnight Black, Mr. Porter, Streetrunner, Tony Dinero and Wonder Arillo, with Chaka Zulu, Jeff Dixon and Ludacris serving as executive producers. It features guest appearances from Ludacris, Lil Wayne, Phonte and Shawnna.

The title of the album was believed to have been changed to Pound 4 Pound, but in an interview Tity Boi confirmed the title to be Supply & Demand. Playaz Circle released a single on called "Circle of Playaz", which featured Jazze Pha and then released "U Can Believe It" featuring Ludacris. The album was pushed back several times, but many tracks leaked onto the internet before release. The album was removed from iTunes in 2012, and it does not appear on music services such as Spotify and Google Play, most likely due to a copyright claim on the name of the group.

The album debuted at No. 27 on the Billboard 200, selling 26,138 copies. In its second week, it dropped to No. 79, selling 11,261 copies.

Track listing

Sample credits
Track 1 contains a sample of "A Woman Needs a Good Man" written by Mikki Farrow, Marvin Jackson and Bunny Sigler and performed by The Three Degrees
Track 7 contains elements of "The Love We Share Is the Greatest of Them All" written by Tom Brock

Charts

References

External links

2007 debut albums
Playaz Circle albums
Albums produced by Buckwild
Disturbing tha Peace albums
Albums produced by Drumma Boy
Albums produced by Mr. Porter
2 Chainz albums